Hoppingen station is a railway stop in the municipality of Harburg (Schwaben), located in the Donau-Ries district in Bavaria, Germany. The station lies on the Ries Railway. The train services are operated by Go-Ahead Bayern.

References 

Railway stations in Bavaria
Buildings and structures in Donau-Ries